Radljevac is a village in the hinterland of Dalmatia, Croatia, located in Šibenik-Knin County near the town of Knin. In 2011, the population counted 75 inhabitants.

References

Populated places in Šibenik-Knin County
Knin